Paul T. Kammerer, Jr. ( – March 2, 1939) was an American lawyer and politician from New York.

Life 
Kammerer was born in about 1887 in New York City, New York, the son of Paul T. and Mary F. Kammerer. He attended the College of the City of New York and Fordham University Law School. He then began practicing law as a member of the law firm Dyer & Kammerer on 51 Chambers St.

In 1923, Kammerer was elected to the New York State Assembly as a Democrat, representing the New York County 12th District. He served in the Assembly in 1924 and 1925. Governor Alfred E. Smith later appointed him a member of the Child Welfare Commission.

In 1929, Kammerer married Agnes Whelan of Elizabeth, New Jersey. They had a daughter, Julie. He was president of the Catholic Youth Organization, a director of the Center Association for Catholics, a governor of the New York Catholic Protectory, a consulter of the Xavier Alumni Sodality, and a member of the Friendly Sons of St. Patrick and the Catholic Club of New York. He was also a director of the New York County Lawyers Association and a member of the New York Bar Association.

Kammerer died at home from a heart ailment on March 2, 1939. He was buried in the Holy Sepulchre Cemetery in East Orange, New Jersey.

References

External links 

 The Political Graveyard

1880s births
1939 deaths
Politicians from Manhattan
Lawyers from New York City
City College of New York alumni
Fordham University School of Law alumni
20th-century American lawyers
20th-century American politicians
Democratic Party members of the New York State Assembly
Catholics from New York (state)
Burials at Holy Sepulchre Cemetery (East Orange, New Jersey)